Plucked string instruments are a subcategory of string instruments that are played by plucking the strings. Plucking is a way of pulling and releasing the string in such a way as to give it an impulse that causes the string to vibrate. Plucking can be done with either a finger or a plectrum.

Most plucked string instruments belong to the lute family (such as guitar, bass guitar, mandolin, banjo, balalaika, sitar, pipa, etc.), which generally consist of a resonating body, and a neck; the strings run along the neck and can be stopped at different pitches. The zither family (including the Qanún/kanun, autoharp, kantele, gusli, kannel, kankles, kokles, koto, guqin, gu zheng and many others) does not have a neck, and the strings are stretched across the soundboard. In the harp family (including the lyre), the strings are perpendicular to the soundboard and do not run across it. The harpsichord does not fit any of these categories but is also a plucked string instrument, as its strings are struck with a plectrum when the keys are depressed.

Bowed string instruments, such as the violin, can also be plucked in the technique known as pizzicato; however, as they are usually played with a bow, they are not included in this category. Struck string instruments (such as the piano) can be similarly plucked as an extended technique.

Plucked string instruments are not a category in the Sachs-Hornbostel classification, aside from 335 and 336, as some of them are simple chordophones and others are composite (depending on whether the resonator is the removable part of the instrument).

List of plucked string instruments 
 3rd bridge guitar
 Akonting
 Appalachian dulcimer (United States)
 Autoharp
 Bağlama (Turkey)
 Baglamas (Greece)
 Bajo sexto (Mexico)
 Balalaika (Russia, Ukraine, Belarus)
 Bandura (Ukraine)
 Bandurria (Spain)
 Bandolin (Ecuador)
 Banjo (American)
 Banjolele (United Kingdom)
 Barbat (Iran)
 Begena (Ethiopia)
 Biwa (Japan)
 Bordonua
 Bouzouki (Greece)
 Bugarija (Croatia)
 Cak (Indonesia)
 Cavaquinho (Portugal and Brazil)
 Çeng (Turkey)
 Charango (South America)
 Chitarra battente (Italy)
 Çiftelia (Albania and Kosovo)
 Citole
 Cittern
 Cobza (Romania and Hungary)
 Colascione
 Contrabass
 Cuatro
 Cuk (Indonesia)
 Cümbüş (Turkey)
 Đàn bầu (Vietnam)
 Đàn nguyệt (Vietnam)
 Đàn tam (Vietnam)
 Đàn tranh (Vietnam)
 Đàn tỳ bà (Vietnam)
 Daruan (China)
 Diddley bow (United States)
 Dombra (East Europe and Central Asia)
 Domra (Russia, Ukraine, Belarus)
 Doshpuluur (Tuva)
Dotara (India)
 Dutar
 Duxianqin (China)
 Ektara (India)
 Electric bass
Electric upright bass
 Gayageum (Korea)
 Geomungo (Korea)
 Gittern
 Gottuvadhyam (India)
 Guitar
Classical guitar
Solid-body classical guitar
Acoustic guitar
Steel-string acoustic guitar
Bass guitar
Acoustic bass guitar
Chapman Stick
Cigar box guitar
Electric guitar
Harp guitar
Resonator guitar (a.k.a. dobro)
Lyre-guitar
 Guitarrón chileno
 Guitarrón mexicano
 Gusli (Russia)
 Guqin (China)
 Guzheng (China)
 Harp
 Electric harp
 Cross-strung harp
 Harpsichord (Europe, keyboard instrument)
 Irish bouzouki
 Jakhe (Thailand)
 Jarana huasteca (Mexico)
 Jarana jarocha (Mexico)
 Jouhikko (Finland, Karelia)
 Jumbush (Turkey)
 Kacapi (Indonesia)
 Kanklės (Lithuania)
 Kannel (instrument) (Estonia)
 Kantele (Finland)
 Kithara (Ancient Greece)
 Kobyz (Kazakhstan)
 Kobza (Ukraine)
 Kokles (Latvia)
 Konghou (China)
 Kontigi (Nigeria)
 Komuz (Central Asia)
 Kora (West Africa)
 Koto (Japan)
 Krar (Ethiopia)
 Kutiyapi (Philippines)
 Langeleik (Norway)
 Laúd
 Liuqin (China)
 Lute (Europe)
Archlute
Theorbo
 Lyre (Ancient Greece, Sumer)
 Mandolin family
 Mandolin
 Mandore (instrument)
 Mandola
 Octave mandola
 Mandocello
 Mandobass
 Mandolone
 Laouto (Greece, Cyprus, Romania, Albania)
 Mandolin-banjo (a crossover instrument, not part of the mandola family)
 Mejoranera
 Mohan veena
 Monochord
 Musical bow
 Nyatiti (Kenya)
 Octavina (Philippines)
 Oud (Middle East, Greece)
 Pandura
 Panduri (Georgia)
 Phandar (Chechnya and Ingushetia)
 Pipa (China)
 Portuguese guitar
 Psaltery
 Qanún/kanun (Middle East, Persia, Greece)
 Qanbūs (Arabian Peninsula)
 Qinqin (China)
 Rawap
 Requinto
 Rote
 Rubab (Iran)
 Rudra veena (India)
 Sagar veena (Pakistan)
 Sallaneh (Iran)
 Sanshin (Japan)
 Sanxian (China)
 Saraswati veena (India)
 Šargija (Eastern Europe)
 Sarod (India)
 Sasando (Indonesia)
 Saung (Burma)
Swaraj (India)
 Saz (Turkey)
 Setar (Iran)
 Shamisen (Japan)
 Sitar (India)
 Tambura
 Tamburitza (Pannonian plain)
 Tanbur (Iran)
 Tar (Iran)
 Tati (Nagaland, India)
 Tea chest bass
 Tiple
Colombian tiple
 Torban
 Tremoloa
 Tres (Cuba)
 Ukulele (Hawaii)
 Valiha (Madagascar)
 Veena (India)
 Vichitra veena (India)
 Vihuela (Spain)
 Viola toeira (Portugal)
 Xalam
 Yueqin (China)
 Zhongruan (China)
 Zhu (China)
 Zither

See also
Stringed instrument tunings

References

External links
Atlas of Plucked Instruments
Classical Guitar Museum (UK)